is a Japanese manga artist and author, best noted for being the creator of the manga series UFO Baby.

Other works
 Daa! Daa! Daa! (|だぁ!だぁ!だぁ!)
 Shin Daa! Daa! Daa! (新☆だぁ!だぁ!だぁ! )
 Happy Ice Cream! (ハッピー アイスクリーム!)
 Awasete Ippon  (あわせて いつぽん)
 Taiho Shite Mi~na! (タイホしてみーな)
 Panic x Panic (ぱにっく×ぱにっく)
 Annin Musume (杏仁小娘)
   "Awasete Ippon"

External links
 

Living people
1973 births
Manga artists from Aichi Prefecture